The coat of arms of Stockholm depicts the head of Swedish king Saint Eric. 
It was first used in medieval seals.

Overview

Blue and yellow are the colours of Stockholm due to the use of blue and gold in the coat of arms of the city.

Saint Eric according to legend was king for four years only, but made a great impact and is considered the patron saint of both Sweden and its capital.

See also
Coat of arms of Sweden

References

External links

Culture in Stockholm
History of Stockholm
Stockholm
Stockholm
Stockholm